Dillinger & Young Gotti II: Tha Saga Continuez... is the third studio album by rap group Tha Dogg Pound.

Commercial performance
According to Soundscan it has sold over 113,000 copies in the United States.

Track listing

Notes
 signifies a co-producer.

Sample credits
"U Remind Me" contains a sample from "Remind Me" performed by Patrice Rushen
"I Luv When U" contains samples from "Wind Parade" performed by Donald Byrd and Boyz-n-the Hood (Remix) performed by Eazy-E

Charts

Weekly charts

References

2005 albums
Tha Dogg Pound albums
Albums produced by Daz Dillinger
Albums produced by L.T. Hutton
Albums produced by Soopafly